AirPods are wireless Bluetooth earbuds designed by Apple Inc. They were first announced on September 7, 2016, alongside the iPhone 7. Within two years, they became Apple's most popular accessory. The most recent model, AirPods (3rd generation), are a replacement to the 1st and 2nd generation models, although the 2nd generation is still sold on Apple's website. These models are Apple's entry-level wireless headphones, sold alongside the AirPods Pro and AirPods Max.

In addition to playing audio, the AirPods contain a microphone that filters out background noise as well as built-in accelerometers and optical sensors capable of detecting taps and pinches (e.g. double-tap or pinch to pause audio) and placement within the ear, which enables automatic pausing of audio when they are taken out.

On March 20, 2019, Apple released the second-generation AirPods, which feature the H1 chip, longer talk time, and hands-free "Hey Siri" support. An optional wireless charging case which costs extra was added in the offerings.

On October 26, 2021, Apple released the third-generation AirPods, which feature an external redesign with shorter stems similar to AirPods Pro, spatial audio, IPX4 water resistance, longer battery life, and MagSafe charging capability.

Models

1st generation 
Apple announced the first generation AirPods on September 7, 2016, at an Apple Special Event alongside the iPhone 7 and Apple Watch Series 2. Apple originally planned to release the AirPods in late October, but delayed the release date. On December 13, 2016, Apple began taking online orders for AirPods. They were available at Apple Stores, Apple Authorized Resellers, and select carriers on December 20, 2016.

AirPods contain a proprietary Apple W1 SoC processor which helps optimize battery use as well as the Bluetooth 4.2 and audio connections. The advanced connectivity functions of the W1 requires devices running iOS 10, macOS Sierra, watchOS 3, or later. They can also function as standard Bluetooth headphones when connected to any device that supports Bluetooth 4.0 or higher, including Windows laptops and Android devices.

There are two microphones inside each AirPod, one facing outward at ear level and another at the bottom of the stem. Each AirPod weighs , and its charging case weighs . The AirPods are capable of holding a charge of around five hours. Charging them for fifteen minutes in the case gives three hours of listening time. The charging case provides 24 hours of total usage time. During a complete dismantling, each AirPod was found to contain a 93 milliwatt hour battery in its stem, while the charging case contains a 1.52 watt hour or 398 mAh at 3.81 V battery.

The model numbers for the first-generation AirPods are A1523 and A1722.

Production of the first-generation AirPods was discontinued on March 20, 2019, after the second generation was released.

2nd generation 
Apple announced the second generation AirPods on March 20, 2019. They are the same design as the first generation, but have updated features. They include an H1 processor which supports hands-free "Hey Siri", Bluetooth 5 connectivity. Apple also claims 50% more talk time and faster device connection times. The "Announce Messages with Siri” feature was added in iOS 13.2, which allows the user to dictate text messages to Siri.

Second-generation AirPods can be purchased with the same charging case as the first generation, or for an additional price bundled with the Wireless Charging Case, which can be used with Qi chargers. The Wireless Charging Case can be purchased separately and is compatible with first-generation AirPods. It moves the charging indicator LED to the exterior of the case. The Wireless Charging Case was initially announced in September 2017 alongside the AirPower charging mat, but was delayed by AirPower's protracted development and eventual cancellation. The second generation AirPods remained on sale with a price cut following the release of the third generation in October 2021, but are now only available with the lightning charging case.

The model numbers for the second-generation AirPods are A2032 and A2031.

3rd generation 
Apple announced the third generation AirPods on October 18, 2021. They feature an external redesign with shorter stems similar to AirPods Pro and use similar force touch controls. They include support for spatial audio and Dolby Atmos, IPX4 water resistance, skin detection and a case supporting MagSafe charging. Apple claims increased battery life, with AirPods lasting six hours and the charging case providing up to 30 hours. Preorders of the third generation AirPods began on October 18, 2021. The third generation AirPods were released on October 26, 2021, and are priced at $179. In September 2022, Apple released a $169 variant with a charging case lacking Qi and MagSafe charging compatibility.

The model numbers for the third-generation AirPods are A2565 and A2564.

Technical specifications 
All of the electronics and circuitry responsible for the audio drivers and Bluetooth transmission are stored entirely within the head of the AirPod. The battery is stored in the stem. The battery and circuit boards are connected via flex/ribbon cable.

Compatibility 
AirPods are compatible with any device that supports Bluetooth 4.0 or higher, including Android and Windows devices, although certain features such as automatic switching between devices are only available on Apple devices using iCloud.

The first-generation AirPods are fully compatible with iPhone, iPad, and iPod touch models with iOS 10 or later, Apple Watch models with watchOS 3 or later, and Mac models with macOS Sierra or later.

The second-generation AirPods are fully compatible with devices running iOS 12.2 or later, macOS Mojave 10.14.4 or later, and watchOS 5.2 or later.

The third-generation AirPods are fully compatible with devices running iOS 15.1 or later, iPadOS 15.1 or later, macOS Monterey 12.0 or later, and watchOS 8.1 or later.

Support 
The lithium-ion batteries in AirPods can see significant degradation over time, with two-year-old sets lasting for less than half of the advertised five hours. Apple has a program to service batteries and purchase replacement individual AirPods and charging cases. The replacement of one or both AirPods or the charging case has a lower price with AppleCare+ than without. Apple offers battery servicing for free with AppleCare+ and for a fee without. However, this is just a replacement service, as AirPods batteries cannot be removed.

AirPods contain upgradeable firmware. Its original firmware was version 3.3.1. In February 2017, Apple released version 3.5.1, 3.7.2 in May 2017, and then 6.3.2 on March 26, 2019. In July 2019, version 6.7.8 was released and 6.8.8 followed in September 2019. In June 2020, firmware 2D15 was released (G2). In September 2020, firmware 3A283 (G2 and Pro) was released and in April 2021, firmware 3E751. AirPods automatically sync through Apple's iCloud service, allowing users to switch audio sources to other supported devices connected by the same Apple ID.

Sales 
Analysts estimate Apple sold between 14 million and 16 million AirPods in 2017. In 2018, AirPods were Apple's most popular accessory product, with 35 million units sold. 60 million units were sold in 2019. Analysts estimate AirPods make up 60% of the global wireless headphone market and that Apple's entire Wearables products (Apple Watch, AirPods, and AirPods Pro) “is now bigger than 60% of the companies in the Fortune 500”. An estimated 5-7% of Apple's revenue from AirPods comes from replacement earbuds and cases. Analysts estimate Apple sold 120 million or so pairs in 2021.

Cultural impact 
On announcement day, AirPods were compared to Apple's previously existing EarPods (2012–present), with The Verge noting "They look... just like the old EarPods, with the wires cut off." Initially mocked by many for their unfamiliar design (including CNN asking "Would people actually wear these?" in 2016), their popularity grew rapidly over the years and they were voted the most popular "hearable" brand of 2019.

At an Apple earnings call in 2019, CEO Tim Cook called AirPods "nothing less than a cultural phenomenon". AirPods had become a viral sensation with memes circulating across the internet about its appearance and its relation to the removal of the headphone jack in iPhones. However, as time wore on, AirPods became known as a status symbol.

Criticism 
One criticism of AirPods is their high price; however, at launch they were actually priced less than most "true wireless" earbuds on the market (e.g. the Samsung Gear IconX and Bragi Dash) and remain competitively priced with similar products from other major brands.

Another prominent criticism was a problem that caused the charging case battery to deplete at a rapid rate despite the AirPods not being used. Users were reporting upwards of 30% idle discharge per day. In response, Apple released a firmware update (version 3.5.1) for the AirPods, which addressed connectivity and battery drain problems.

According to the Financial Times, AirPods are difficult if not impossible to recycle, and not designed to be repairable.

Replacement for hearing aids
In 2022, researchers at the Taipei Veterans General Hospital in Taiwan compared  the performance of AirPods 2 and the original AirPods Pro using Live Listen on an iPhone or iPad to compare to medical hearing aids. Oticon Opn 1 was the high-end comparison, with Bernafon MD1 as the more affordable alternative. The performance of the systems were at least assisting participants with Pro (including noise cancelling features) being better and approximating the hearing aids.

Competition 
Some consumers expressed the viewpoint that there were better options for wireless earphones based on quality and cost. One of Apple's biggest competitors is Samsung, which markets wireless earbuds that are very similar to AirPods. Another similar product line is from Apple's Beats Electronics, which sells products such as the Powerbeats Pro wireless earbuds.

See also 
 Apple headphones
EarPods
AirPods Pro
AirPods Max
 Pixel Buds
 Hearables
 Powerbeats Pro

References

External links 
  – official site

Apple Inc. peripherals
IPhone accessories
Headphones
Products introduced in 2016